Jessica Leigh Stroup (born October 23, 1986) is an American actress, best known for her role as Erin Silver on 90210 (2008–2013), Max Hardy on The Following (2014–2015) and Joy Meachum on Iron Fist (2017–2018), which is set in the Marvel Cinematic Universe (MCU). She is regarded as a scream queen for starring in the horror films Vampire Bats (2005), Left in Darkness (2006), The Hills Have Eyes 2 (2007), Prom Night (2008) and Homecoming (2009).

Early life
Stroup was born in Anderson, South Carolina, the daughter of Judith and Don Stroup, a senior vice president at MUFG Union Bank. She spent her childhood in Charlotte, North Carolina. She graduated from Providence High School in 2004. Stroup received a full scholarship to attend the University of Georgia, but declined in order to pursue an acting career.

Career
Stroup's first acting role was a guest appearance on a 2005 episode of Unfabulous. Stroup has since appeared in a number of other TV shows, such as Grey's Anatomy, October Road, and True Blood. In 2007, Stroup appeared in 4 episodes of Reaper, in which she played the protagonist's ex-girlfriend. She appeared in a number of small independent movie productions, such as Left in Darkness, Pray for Morning, Vampire Bats.

In March 2007, Stroup starred as the female lead in The Hills Have Eyes 2. Stroup played the role of a US Army National Guard soldier named Amber who fights for survival with her peers against a group of mutant people. The film was a fast-forward sequel to The Hills Have Eyes, a remake of the 1977 movie of the same name. Despite negative reviews from critics the film went on to gross over $67 million worldwide. That same year Jessica had a supporting role in This Christmas.

In April 2008, Stroup was cast as a series regular on 90210, a reboot of the Golden Globe Award-nominated series Beverly Hills, 90210. Stroup played the role of high school student Erin Silver, the younger sister of David Silver and Kelly Taylor from Beverly Hills, 90210. The pilot premiered on September 2, 2008, to a high 4.65 million viewers despite mixed reviews from critics. In 2010 Stroup was awarded the "Sparkling Performance" award at the Young Hollywood Awards.

Also in April 2008, Stroup played the role of Claire in the film remake Prom Night. In December 2007, MTV.com announced that Stroup was cast in another horror film titled Homecoming, which follows a young woman being kidnapped by her boyfriend's ex-girlfriend. Despite the film completing production in February 2008, it was not released until July 2009 for a limited release in selected cinemas. In 2008, Stroup played Rachel in the ensemble film The Informers.

In 2011, Stroup guest-appeared on Family Guy, in which she voiced a number of characters in two episodes. Stroup reunited with Seth MacFarlane in his directorial debut Ted, in which she played Tracy, Lori's (played by Mila Kunis) friend at work.

On August 20, 2013, it was announced that Stroup would join The Following in season 2 as a series regular. Her character, Max, is "the niece of Ryan Hardy (Kevin Bacon). She’s an NYPD cop, currently working in the Intel Division. Max reconnects with Ryan and she becomes a valuable ally."

In March 2017, she joined the cast of Iron Fist as Joy Meachum.

Personal life

Stroup currently lives in Los Angeles, California. Stroup married businessman Neil Hutchinson on September 17, 2022.

Filmography

References

External links

 
 
 

1986 births
21st-century American actresses
Actresses from North Carolina
Actresses from South Carolina
American film actresses
American television actresses
Living people
People from Anderson, South Carolina
Actresses from Charlotte, North Carolina